Ahmar ( (ʾaḥmar) meaning "red") or Al Ahmar (الاحمر) may refer to:

Places
Ahmar Mountains, mountains in Ethiopia
Ahmar, Myanmar, town in Ayeyarwady Region, Myanmar
Containing the word Ahmar
Al-Ras al-Ahmar, Palestinian Arab village in the Safad Subdistrict
Bab al-Ahmar, one of the nine historical gates of the Ancient City of Aleppo, Syria
Dahr El Ahmar, Lebanese village 
Deir el Ahmar, Lebanese town
Khirbet ar-Ras al-Ahmar, Palestinian village in the Tubas Governorate of the West Bank
Rasm Al-Ahmar, Syrian village
Wadi al Ahmar, area within Sirte District

Ahmar
Ahmar Mahboob, Australian Pakistani linguist and professor

Al-Ahmar
Abdullah al-Ahmar (born 1936), Syrian politician
Dorotheus IV Ibn Al-Ahmar (died 1611), Melkite Patriarch of Antioch
Ismail ibn al-Ahmar (1387–1406), Moroccan historian

Yemeni family
Abdullah ibn Husayn al-Ahmar (1933–2007), Yemeni politician
Ali Mohsen al-Ahmar (born 1945), Yemeni military officer
Sadiq al-Ahmar (born 1956), Yemeni politician
Sam Yahya Al-Ahmar, Yemeni politician
Hamid al-Ahmar (born 1967), Yemeni businessman and politician
Hashid Abdullah al-Ahmar, Yemeni politician

Arabic-language surnames